Commodore Richard Temple Menhinick  is a retired senior officer of the Royal Australian Navy (RAN).

Naval career
He joined the Royal Australian Navy in 1976, finishing his training in 1980 he underwent training as a Principal Warfare Officer and in 1983 was posted as the naval Aide-de-Camp to the Governor of Tasmania, Sir James Plimsoll. Menhinick went on to serve as exchange officer with the Royal Navy on board .

He was serving as the Commandant of the Australian Command and Staff College until 2012 when he handed over to Brigadier Peter Gates.

Honours and awards

References

External links
 Australian Department of Defence biography

Military personnel from Belfast
Australian military personnel of the Gulf War
Living people
Members of the Order of Australia
Recipients of the Conspicuous Service Cross (Australia)
Recipients of the Commendation for Distinguished Service
Royal Australian Navy officers
Recipients of the Meritorious Unit Citation
Year of birth missing (living people)